Sinio is a comune (municipality) in the Province of Cuneo in the Italian region Piedmont, located about  southeast of Turin and about  northeast of Cuneo.

Sinio borders the following municipalities: Albaretto della Torre, Cerreto Langhe, Montelupo Albese, Roddino, Rodello, and Serralunga d'Alba.

Demographic evolution

References

Cities and towns in Piedmont